Gauna is a genus of snout moths described by Francis Walker in 1866.

Species
 Gauna aegusalis Walker, 1859
 Gauna cacaalis Lucas 1891
 Gauna duplicilinea (Hampson, 1893)
 Gauna flavibasalis (Hampson, 1906)
 Gauna mediolineata (Hampson, 1903)
 Gauna phaealis (Hampson, 1906)
 Gauna pyralodes (Hampson, 1916)
 Gauna serratilis (Snellen, 1890)

References
www.nhm.ac.uk Genus Database
Encyclopedia of Life
Walker, 1866. List Spec. lepid. Insects Colln Br. Mus. (34) : 1252

Pyralini
Pyralidae genera